The 1987 North Carolina Tar Heels football team represented the University of North Carolina at Chapel Hill during the 1987 NCAA Division I-A football season. The Tar Heels were led by tenth-year head coach Dick Crum and played their home games at Kenan Memorial Stadium in Chapel Hill, North Carolina. They competed as members of the Atlantic Coast Conference, finishing in sixth. Coach Dick Crum resigned at the end of the season, leaving as the school's all-time winningest coach.

Schedule

Personnel

References

North Carolina
North Carolina Tar Heels football seasons
North Carolina Tar Heels football